Fenobam is an imidazole derivative developed by McNeil Laboratories in the late 1970s as a novel anxiolytic drug with an at-the-time-unidentified molecular target in the brain. Subsequently, it was determined that fenobam acts as a potent and selective negative allosteric modulator of the metabotropic glutamate receptor subtype mGluR5, and it has been used as a lead compound for the development of a range of newer mGluR5 antagonists.

Fenobam has anxiolytic effects comparable to those of benzodiazepine drugs, but was never commercially marketed for the treatment of anxiety due to dose-limiting side effects such as amnesia and psychotomimetic symptoms. Following the discovery of its activity as a potent negative allosteric modulator of mGluR5, fenobam has been re-investigated for many applications, with its profile of combined antidepressant, anxiolytic, analgesic and anti-addictive effects potentially useful given the common co-morbidity of these symptoms. It has also shown promising initial results in the treatment of fragile X syndrome. It was developed by a team at McNeil Laboratories in the 1970s.

Chemistry
Fenobam is known to exist in five crystalline forms, all of them exhibiting a tautomeric structure with the proton attached to the five membered ring nitrogen.

See also
AZD9272
Basimglurant
MPEP
MTEP
MFZ 10-7

References

Anxiolytics
Imidazolines
Lactams
Ureas
Chloroarenes
Orphan drugs
MGlu5 receptor antagonists
Abandoned drugs